Ivan Menjivar (born May 30, 1982) is a Salvadorian-Canadian mixed martial artist who formerly fought in the featherweight division of the Ultimate Fighting Championship.

Background
Menjivar was born in La Paz, El Salvador, in 1982. Fleeing the corrupt government, Menjivar moved to Montreal with his family when he was 11. He has a brother and a sister. He started training Kung-Fu as a kid, eventually progressing to Brazilian Jiu-Jitsu.

Mixed martial arts career

Early career
Menjivar formerly fought in the welterweight and lightweight divisions, before dropping to featherweight.

Menjivar made his MMA debut in 2001 and fought until 2006, earning a record of 20–7. After he was defeated by Bart Palaszewski at an IFL event, he retired from MMA. Four years later, he came out of retirement for W-1 MMA, defeating Aaron Miller by triangle choke submission in round one.

World Extreme Cagefighting
In November 2010, Menjivar signed with the WEC, right before its merger with the UFC.

In his promotional debut, Menjivar dropped to bantamweight and faced Brad Pickett on December 16, 2010 at WEC 53, the final WEC event. After a back and forth fight, Menjivar lost via unanimous decision. The bout won Fight of the Night honors.

Ultimate Fighting Championship
On October 28, 2010, WEC merged with the UFC. As part of the merger, all WEC fighters were transferred to the UFC.

Menjivar defeated Charlie Valencia via first round TKO on April 30, 2011 at UFC 129, after breaking his nose with a short elbow and following up with punches to finish the fight in 90 seconds.

Menjivar next faced Nick Pace on August 6, 2011 at UFC 133. The bout was held at a catchweight of 138 pounds after Menjivar failed to make weight. He won the fight via unanimous decision.

Menjivar submitted John Albert with a first round rear naked choke on February 15, 2012 at UFC on Fuel TV 1. His performance earned him the Submission of the Night award.

Menjivar was expected to face Renan Barão at UFC 148 on July 7, 2012. However, Barão was pulled from the bout to face Urijah Faber for the Interim Bantamweight Title on the same card. Menjivar instead faced Mike Easton at the event and lost the fight via unanimous decision.

Menjivar defeated promotional newcomer Azamat Gashimov via first round submission due to an armbar on November 17, 2012 at UFC 154. The performance earned Menjivar Submission of the Night honors.

Menjivar faced Urijah Faber on February 23, 2013 at UFC 157. He lost the fight via submission in the first round.

Menjivar was expected to face Norifumi Yamamoto on September 21, 2013 at UFC 165.  However, Yamamoto was removed from the bout and was replaced by Wilson Reis. Menjivar lost the fight via unanimous decision.

Menjivar faced Hatsu Hioki in a featherweight bout on March 1, 2014 at The Ultimate Fighter: China Finale. He lost the fight via unanimous decision, and was subsequently released from the promotion.

Personal life
Menjivar and his wife have two children, a daughter and a son. He balances MMA with a full-time job as a bus driver for the public transport of Montreal STM.

Championships and achievements
Ultimate Fighting Championship
Submission of the Night (Two times) vs. John Albert and Azamat Gashimov

Mixed martial arts record

|-
| Loss
| align=center| 25–12
| Hatsu Hioki
| Decision (unanimous)
| The Ultimate Fighter China Finale: Kim vs. Hathaway
| 
| align=center| 3
| align=center| 5:00
| Macau, SAR, China
| 
|-
| Loss
| align=center| 25–11
| Wilson Reis
| Decision (unanimous)
| UFC 165
| 
| align=center| 3
| align=center| 5:00
| Toronto, Ontario, Canada
| 
|-
| Loss
| align=center| 25–10
| Urijah Faber
| Submission (rear-naked choke)
| UFC 157
| 
| align=center| 1
| align=center| 4:34
| Anaheim, California, United States
| 
|-
| Win
| align=center| 25–9
| Azamat Gashimov
| Submission (armbar)
| UFC 154
| 
| align=center| 1
| align=center| 2:44
| Montreal, Quebec, Canada
| 
|-
| Loss
| align=center| 24–9
| Mike Easton
| Decision (unanimous)
| UFC 148
| 
| align=center| 3
| align=center| 5:00
| Las Vegas, Nevada, United States
| 
|-
| Win
| align=center| 24–8
| John Albert
| Submission (rear-naked choke)
| UFC on Fuel TV: Sanchez vs. Ellenberger
| 
| align=center| 1
| align=center| 3:45
| Omaha, Nebraska, United States
| 
|-
| Win
| align=center| 23–8
| Nick Pace
| Decision (unanimous)
| UFC 133
| 
| align=center| 3
| align=center| 5:00
| Philadelphia, Pennsylvania, United States
| 
|-
| Win
| align=center| 22–8
| Charlie Valencia
| TKO (elbow and punches)
| UFC 129
| 
| align=center| 1
| align=center| 1:30
| Toronto, Ontario, Canada
| 
|-
| Loss
| align=center| 21–8
| Brad Pickett
| Decision (unanimous)
| WEC 53
| 
| align=center| 3
| align=center| 5:00
| Glendale, Arizona, United States
| 
|-
| Win
| align=center| 21–7
| Aaron Miller
| Submission (triangle choke)
| W-1 MMA 5: Judgment Day
| 
| align=center| 1
| align=center| 2:25
| Montreal, Quebec, Canada
| 
|-
| Loss
| align=center| 20–7
| Bart Palaszewski
| Decision (split)
| International Fight League: World Championship Semifinals
| 
| align=center| 3
| align=center| 4:00
| Portland, Oregon, United States
| 
|-
| Loss
| align=center| 20–6
| Caol Uno
| Decision (unanimous)
| Hero's 7
| 
| align=center| 2
| align=center| 5:00
| Yokohama, Japan
| 
|-
| Win
| align=center| 20–5
| Hideo Tokoro
| Decision (majority)
| Hero's 6
| 
| align=center| 2
| align=center| 5:00
| Tokyo, Japan
| 
|-
| Win
| align=center| 19–5
| Justin Tavernini
| Submission (triangle choke)
| Ultimate Cage Wars 4
| 
| align=center| 1
| align=center| N/A
| Winnipeg, Manitoba, Canada
| 
|-
| Win
| align=center| 18–5
| Taiyo Nakahara
| Decision (unanimous)
| Hero's 5
| 
| align=center| 2
| align=center| 5:00
| Tokyo, Japan
| 
|-
| Loss
| align=center| 17–5
| Urijah Faber
| DQ (illegal kick to downed opponent)
| TKO 24: Eruption
| 
| align=center| 2
| align=center| 2:02
| Laval, Quebec, Canada
| 
|-
| Win
| align=center| 17–4
| Joe Lauzon
| Submission (calf slicer)
| APEX: Undisputed
| 
| align=center| 1
| align=center| 3:39
| Montreal, Quebec, Canada
| 
|-
| Win
| align=center| 16–4
| Mika Shida
| Decision (unanimous)
| Pancrase: Spiral 6
| 
| align=center| 3
| align=center| 5:00
| Tokyo, Japan
| 
|-
| Win
| align=center| 15–4
| Brandon Carlson
| Submission (rear-naked choke)
| KOTC: Edmonton
| 
| align=center| 1
| align=center| 0:45
| Edmonton, Alberta, Canada
| 
|-
| Win
| align=center| 14–4
| Ryan Ackerman
| TKO (punches)
| APEX: Genesis
| 
| align=center| 2
| align=center| 2:02
| Montreal, Quebec, Canada
| 
|-
| Loss
| align=center| 13–4
| Matt Serra
| Decision (unanimous)
| UFC 48
| 
| align=center| 3
| align=center| 5:00
| Las Vegas, Nevada, United States
| 
|-
| Win
| align=center| 13–3
| Mike French
| Submission (armbar)
| Ultimate Generation Combat 6
| 
| align=center| 1
| align=center| 0:40
| Montreal, Quebec, Canada
| 
|-
| Win
| align=center| 12–3
| Antoine Coutu
| TKO
| Ultimate Generation Combat 5
| 
| align=center| 1
| align=center| N/A
| Montreal, Quebec, Canada
| 
|-
| Loss
| align=center| 11–3
| Vítor Ribeiro
| Decision (unanimous)
| Absolute Fighting Championships 4
| 
| align=center| 3
| align=center| 5:00
| Fort Lauderdale, Florida, United States
| 
|-
| Win
| align=center| 11–2
| Brandon Shuey
| Submission (kneebar)
| WFF 4: Civil War
| 
| align=center| 1
| align=center| 0:38
| Vancouver, British Columbia, Canada
| 
|-
| Win
| align=center| 10–2
| Max Marin
| TKO
| MFC: Unplugged
| 
| align=center| 1
| align=center| 4:12
| Edmonton, Alberta, Canada
| 
|-
| Win
| align=center| 9–2
| Andy Social
| Submission (armbar)
| UCC Proving Ground 8
| 
| align=center| 1
| align=center| 0:20
| Victoriaville, Quebec, Canada
| 
|-
| Win
| align=center| 8–2
| Shane Rice
| TKO (punches)
| UCC 11: The Next Level
| 
| align=center| 1
| align=center| 1:58
| Montreal, Quebec, Canada
| 
|-
|  Win
| align=center| 7–2
| Jay R. Palmer
| KO (suplex)
| UCC Hawaii: Eruption in Hawaii
| 
| align=center| 1
| align=center| 1:03
| Honolulu, Hawaii, United States
| 
|-
| Win
| align=center| 6–2
| Jeff Curran
| Decision (unanimous)
| UCC 10: Battle for the Belts 2002
| 
| align=center| 3
| align=center| 5:00
| Hull, Quebec, Canada
| 
|-
| Loss
| align=center| 5–2
| Jason Black
| Submission (guillotine choke)
| UCC 8: Fast and Furious
| 
| align=center| 1
| align=center| 3:33
| Rimouski, Quebec, Canada
| 
|-
| Win
| align=center| 5–1
| Andy Lalonde
| TKO (punches)
| UCC Proving Ground 4
| 
| align=center| 1
| align=center| 1:00
| Victoriaville, Quebec, Canada
| 
|-
| Loss
| align=center| 4–1
| Georges St-Pierre
| TKO (punches)
| UCC 7: Bad Boyz
| 
| align=center| 1
| align=center| 4:59
| Montreal, Quebec, Canada
| 
|-
| Win
| align=center| 4–0
| Dany Ward
| KO (head kick)
| UCC Proving Ground 2
| 
| align=center| 1
| align=center| 1:05
| Saint-Jean-sur-Richelieu, Quebec, Canada
| 
|-
| Win
| align=center| 3–0
| Francois Flibotte
| Submission (rear-naked choke)
| UCC Proving Ground 1
| 
| align=center| 1
| align=center| 1:24
| Saint-Jean-sur-Richelieu, Quebec, Canada
| 
|-
| Win
| align=center| 2–0
| J.F. Bolduc
| Decision (split)
| UCC 4: Return Of The Super Strikers
| 
| align=center| 1
| align=center| 10:00
| Sherbrooke, Quebec, Canada
| 
|-
| Win
| align=center| 1–0
| David Guigui
| TKO (punches)
| UCC 3: Battle for the Belts
| 
| align=center| 1
| align=center| 7:54
| Sherbrooke, Quebec, Canada
|

References

External links

Official UFC Profile

1982 births
Living people
Canadian people of Salvadoran descent
Canadian male mixed martial artists
Salvadoran male mixed martial artists
Bantamweight mixed martial artists
Featherweight mixed martial artists
Lightweight mixed martial artists
Welterweight mixed martial artists
Mixed martial artists utilizing wushu
Mixed martial artists utilizing Muay Thai
Mixed martial artists utilizing Brazilian jiu-jitsu
Canadian practitioners of Brazilian jiu-jitsu
Canadian wushu practitioners
Canadian Muay Thai practitioners
Salvadoran practitioners of Brazilian jiu-jitsu
Salvadoran wushu practitioners
Salvadoran Muay Thai practitioners
Salvadoran emigrants to Canada
People awarded a black belt in Brazilian jiu-jitsu
Sportspeople from Quebec
Ultimate Fighting Championship male fighters